Víctor Emeric Catarineau (born May 29, 1952) is a Puerto Rican politician and was the mayor of Vieques. Emeric is affiliated with the Popular Democratic Party (PPD) and has served as mayor from 2013 till January 11 2021.

ABRE Puerto Rico gave the mayor a D fiscal rating for his administration handling of Vieques during the 2016 fiscal year and ranking it 50th in fiscal health among the municipalities.

References

External links
Víctor Emeric Profile on WAPA-TV

Living people
1952 births
People from Vieques, Puerto Rico
Mayors of places in Puerto Rico
Popular Democratic Party (Puerto Rico) politicians